Wisner Township is a civil township of Tuscola County in the U.S. state of Michigan.  The population was 690 at the 2010 Census.

The first land entries in this area were made by Joshua Terry in 1853, by Green Bird in 1854, and by Isaiah Jester in 1855. The township was first organized in 1861 and named after Moses Wisner, Governor of Michigan from 1859 to 1861.

Communities 
The name Quanicassee is of Native American origin meaning "lone tree". The area had been an Indian fishing village long before the arrival of white settlers and there are no clear records regarding early settlement. A post office with the name "Quanicasse City" was established on June 11, 1886, with Horace G. Webster as the first postmaster. The office operated until March 31, 1902.
A post office named Wisner was established on December 11, 1871, with Henry H. Gilbert as the first postmaster. The post office operated until May 31, 1905.
 The village of Akron is to the east, and the Akron post office, with ZIP code 48701, also serves the northeast portion of Wisner Township.
 The village of Fairgrove is to the southeast, and the Fairgrove post office, with ZIP code 48733, also serves the southwest portion of Wisner Township.

Geography

Demographics
As of the census of 2000, there were 749 people, 309 households, and 231 families residing in the township. There were 368 housing units at an average density of 19.0 per square mile (7.3/km). The racial makeup of the township was 97.20% White, 0.13% African American, 0.67% Native American, 0.13% Asian, 0.13% Pacific Islander, 0.53% from other races, and 1.20% from two or more races. Hispanic or Latino of any race were 3.07% of the population.

There were 309 households, out of which 24.6% had children under the age of 18 living with them, 64.4% were married couples living together, 5.8% had a female householder with no husband present, and 25.2% were non-families. 22.0% of all households were made up of individuals, and 8.1% had someone living alone who was 65 years of age or older.  The average household size was 2.42 and the average family size was 2.80.

In the township the population was spread out, with 19.8% under the age of 18, 7.3% from 18 to 24, 25.5% from 25 to 44, 31.0% from 45 to 64, and 16.4% who were 65 years of age or older.  The median age was 44 years. For every 100 females, there were 109.8 males.  For every 100 females age 18 and over, there were 110.1 males.

The median income for a household in the township was $35,250, and the median income for a family was $47,625. Males had a median income of $39,375 versus $25,625 for females. The per capita income for the township was $20,153.  About 10.6% of families and 13.0% of the population were below the poverty line, including 17.6% of those under age 18 and 4.7% of those age 65 or over.

References

Townships in Tuscola County, Michigan
1861 establishments in Michigan
Populated places on Lake Huron in the United States
Townships in Michigan